Sport Club Genus de Porto Velho, commonly referred to as Genus, is a Brazilian football club based in Porto Velho, Rondônia. The club competes in the Campeonato Rondoniense Série A, the top division in the Rondônia state football league system.

Currently, Genus is the sixth-best ranked team from Rondônia in CBF's national club ranking, being placed 228th overall.

History
Sport Club Genus de Porto Velho were founded on November 15, 1981 as Sport Club Genus Rondoniense. Genus competed in the Série C in 2001, and in the Série D in 2009, when they were eliminated in the second stage by São Raimundo. The club were renamed to Sport Club Genus de Porto Velho in 2006.

Stadium
Genus play their home games at Aluízio Ferreira. The stadium has a maximum capacity of 7,000 people.

Honours
 Campeonato Rondoniense
 Winners (1): 2015

References

External links
 Genus on Globo Esporte

Sport Club Genus de Porto Velho
Association football clubs established in 1991
Football clubs in Rondônia
Football clubs in Brazil
Porto Velho
1991 establishments in Brazil